Al-Hilal Sports Club also known as Hilal Kadougli is a football club from Kadougli, Sudan. They play in the top level of Sudanese professional football, the Sudan Premier League.

Achievements

Kadougli League
Champion:

Current squad (2018-2019)

References

External links
Club logo
 Team: Hilal Kadougli

Football clubs in Sudan
1962 establishments in Sudan